Melvin Jackson is a former guard in the National Football League.

Biography
Jackson was born on May 5, 1954 in Los Angeles, California. He is the grandfather of Miami Dolphins tackle Austin Jackson.

Career
Jackson was drafted by the Green Bay Packers in the twelfth round of the 1976 NFL Draft and played five seasons with the team. He played at the collegiate level at the University of Southern California.

See also
List of Green Bay Packers players

References

1954 births
Living people
Players of American football from Los Angeles
Green Bay Packers players
American football offensive guards
USC Trojans football players